Angylocalyx talbotii is a species of flowering plant in the family Fabaceae. It is found in Cameroon and Nigeria. Its natural habitat is subtropical or tropical moist lowland forests. It is threatened by habitat loss.

References

Angylocalyceae
Flora of Nigeria
Flora of Cameroon
Vulnerable plants
Taxonomy articles created by Polbot